La Tribune des Peuples (The People's Tribune) was a Polish-led French-language radical and romantic nationalist political daily magazine, published in Paris between March and November 1849 - except for a hiatus caused by censorship (14 April-31 August). The founder and editor-in-chief was Adam Mickiewicz, one of the greatest Polish poets.

Among the co-workers were liberal activists and commentators of different nationalities, belonging to the émigré communities of 1848 revolutionaries. The magazine propagated ideas of international solidarity and the power of revolutions in the fight for liberation of nations and societies; it  pointed out the reactionary character of the policies of Imperial Russia and the Holy See.

As a result of the intervention of the Russian embassy of Nicholas I, the headquarters of the magazine were closed by the French police force on 10 November, 1849.

Mickiewicz's contributions were collected by his son, Władysław, translated into Polish by Antoni Krasnowolski and published in Warsaw (Biblioteka Naukowa) in 1907.

Notable co-workers
Nicolae Bălcescu
Franciszek Ksawery Godebski

References

See also
 Great Emigration

1849 establishments in France
1849 disestablishments in France
Defunct political magazines published in France
French-language magazines
Magazines established in 1849
Magazines disestablished in 1849
Magazines published in Paris
Political magazines published in Poland
Revolutions of 1848